Täferrot is a village in the German state of Baden-Württemberg, in Ostalbkreis district.  Originally named Rot, it was named Afrenrot (after Saint Afra) in 1298 to distinguish it from other towns with the same name.  This became corrupted to Täferrot.

Mayors
1999–2015: Jochen Renner
2015–2019: Daniel Vogt.
since 2019: Markus Bareis

References

Ostalbkreis